Sławomir Kłosowski (born 21 February 1964 in Wambierzyce) is a Polish politician. He was elected to the Sejm on 25 September 2005, getting 17,894 votes in 21 Opole district as a candidate from the Law and Justice list.

See also
Members of Polish Sejm 2005-2007

External links
Sławomir Kłosowski - parliamentary page - includes declarations of interest, voting record, and transcripts of speeches.

1964 births
Living people
People from Radków
Members of the Polish Sejm 2005–2007
Law and Justice politicians
MEPs for Poland 2014–2019
Members of the Polish Sejm 2007–2011
Members of the Polish Sejm 2011–2015